The 1919–20 Penn Quakers men's basketball team represented the University of Pennsylvania during the 1919–20 NCAA men's basketball season in the United States. The head coach was Lon Jourdet, coaching in his sixth season with the Quakers. The team finished the season with a 21–1 record and was retroactively named the national champion by the Helms Athletic Foundation and the Premo-Porretta Power Poll.

Penn defeated the University of Chicago two games to zero in a best-of-three tournament at the end of the season to determine the national champion. Senior Hubert Peck was named a consensus All-American for the second time in his career (he was also selected in 1918).

Schedule and results

|-
!colspan=9 style="background:#011F5B; color:#FFFFFF;"| Regular season

Source

References

Penn Quakers men's basketball seasons
NCAA Division I men's basketball tournament championship seasons
Penn
Penn Quakers Men's Basketball Team
Penn Quakers Men's Basketball Team